Sembung Station (station code: SMB) is a third-class railway station in Sembung, Perak, Jombang Regency, East Java, Indonesia, operated by Kereta Api Indonesia. This railway station is at the most western railway station in Jombang Regency. This station is located Jalan Raya Sembung, 100 m south of  Jombang–Kertosono Road. This station's new building is operated—which has four tracks (two main lines and two passing tracks)—since Jombang–Baron double track segment activation on 30 October 2019.

Services 
This railway station has no train services except for train overtaking.

References

External links 

 Kereta Api Indonesia - Indonesian railway company's official website

Jombang Regency
Railway stations in East Java